Jelangkung is a 2001 Indonesian horror film directed by Rizal Mantovani and Jose Poernomo. It was the only domestic feature film released that year and became a popular sensation. Originally released on a single screen, the film was later distributed to other movie theaters and was eventually seen by 1.5million people nationwide. Jelangkung'''s success has been credited with reviving the genre of Indonesian horror.

 Plot Jelangkung is set in the fictional Javanese village of Angkerbatu, which is rumored to be haunted after a 1938 ritual killing of a twelve-year-old boy by villagers who feared him as the harbinger of disaster. In the present day, teenagers who regularly explore haunted locations around Jakarta hear about the village and decide to travel there. They discover the village ruins and the boy's grave but return to Jakarta disappointed because they encountered no ghosts. The group discovers that one of the teenagers has placed a jailangkung anthropomorphic totem on the boy's grave to summon his ghost, so they return to Angkerbatu to remove the totem. The ghost, however, resists, and one of the teenagers kills his girlfriend during a fit of hallucination. In the final scene, the ghost leaps directly at the viewer.

 Production 
Directors Rizal Mantovani and Jose Poernomo began their careers as music video directors. In creating Jelangkung, they combined the aesthetics and editing of music videos with Indonesian mythology. The film was originally produced as a television film for the newly-launched Trans TV network but was subsequently changed to a cinema release at the urging of journalist-turned-producer Erwin Arnada after his company Rexinema joined the its production. Principal photography began in December 2000 and was completed in two weeks. Production of the film cost Rp1.9billion (US$190,000).

 Release Jelangkung was originally released on 5 October 2001 on a single screen in Pondok Indah Mall in South Jakarta. It was the first film to be screened digitally by the Cinema 21 theater chain but was later transferred to celluloid film stock for easier distribution after audiences turned out and queued for hours for tickets. It was the only domestic feature film released in 2001, an aftereffect of halted film productions and abandoned projects following the 1997 Asian financial crisis and the fall of President Suharto in 1998. The film remained in cinemas for three months. It was seen by 750,000 people in the Jakarta metropolitan area and by 1.5million people throughout the country.

 Reception Jelangkung is credited with reviving Indonesian horror, establishing new codes and conventions for the film genre. For example, every horror film made since Jelangkung has included a time gap between the original violent incident and the first appearance of the ghost. The success of Jelangkung and other domestically-produced films such as Petualangan Sherina (2000) and Ada Apa Dengan Cinta?'' (2002) led venture capitalists, bankers, and other businesspeople to invest in the Indonesian film industry as a way to potentially gain quick profit and media attention.

References

Citations

Bibliography

External links 

2001 horror films
2001 in Indonesia
Indonesian supernatural horror films